Jabber may refer to:
 The original name of the Extensible Messaging and Presence Protocol (XMPP), the open technology for instant messaging and presence.
 Jabber.org, the public, free instant messaging and presence service based on XMPP.
 Jabber XCP, a commercial product which is an implementation of XMPP. Acquired  by Cisco Systems in 2008.
 An abnormally long transmission on an Ethernet network or link.